Çayqovuşan is a village in the Kalbajar District of Azerbaijan. Çayqovuşan was one of two villages of Kalbajar forming an enclave inside of the Mardakert District of the former Nagorno-Karabakh Autonomous Oblast of the Azerbaijan SSR.

Aghdaban tragedy 
On 8 April 1992, Armenian forces attacked Aghdaban and the nearby Chaygovushan village. According to Azerbaijani sources, during the attack, the whole village of Aghdaban, which consisted of 130 homes was burned down, over 30 people were killed and over 100 were tortured.

References

External links 

Populated places in Kalbajar District